is a train station in Ebino, Miyazaki Prefecture, Japan. It is operated by JR Kyushu and is on the Kitto Line.

Lines

Layout 
The station consists of a side platform serving a single track at grade. There is no station building but a simple shed has been set up at the station entrance to serve as a waiting room. A ramp leads up to the platform from there. A bike shed is provided nearby.

Adjacent stations

History
The station was opened by Japanese National Railways (JNR) on 5 July 1957 with the name  as an additional station on the existing track of the Kitto Line. With the privatization of JNR on 1 April 1987, the station came under the control of JR Kyushu. The station was renamed Ebino Uwae on 1 November 1990.

Passenger statistics
In fiscal 2016, the station was used by an average of 15 passengers (boarding only) per day.

See also
List of railway stations in Japan

References

External links

  

Railway stations in Miyazaki Prefecture
Railway stations in Japan opened in 1957